Mark Randall Hamilton (born February 25, 1945) is an American academic, and a past president of the University of Alaska.  Hamilton graduated with a B.S. degree from the U.S. Military Academy in 1967. He received his master's degree in English literature from Florida State University.  Additionally, he graduated from the Armed Forces Staff College in Virginia, and the U.S. Army War College in Pennsylvania. In 1998, he was selected to be the president of the University of Alaska System.  Prior to this position, Hamilton served in the United States Army where he earned the rank of major general.  His last major military duty post was that of head of recruiting for the Army.  He retired with 31 years of service and accepted the president's position at UA soon thereafter.

References

External links
Detailed biography

1945 births
Living people
United States Military Academy alumni
Florida State University alumni
United States Army generals
Recipients of the Distinguished Service Medal (US Army)
Recipients of the Defense Distinguished Service Medal
Presidents of the University of Alaska System